General elections were held in Bermuda on 17 December 2012 to elect all 36 members of the House of Assembly. The result was a victory for the One Bermuda Alliance, led by Craig Cannonier, which won 19 seats in the House of Assembly. The incumbent Progressive Labour Party (PLP) lost five seats and government, and Premier Paula Cox lost her Devonshire North West seat, and resigned as leader of the PLP the next day, with Derrick Burgess becoming Acting Party Leader. Marc Bean became PLP leader on 22 December 2012.

Results

References

Bermuda
Bermuda
2012 in Bermuda
December 2012 events in North America
Elections in Bermuda